The Third Bay Tradition (Third Bay Area Tradition) is an architectural style from the period of 1945 through the 1980s that was rooted in the greater San Francisco Bay Area, with its best known example being Sea Ranch. Considered a hybrid of modern and vernacular styles, the tradition was codified by the design works of Donlyn Lyndon, Charles Moore, and William Turnbull. It was characterized by turning the horizontal form of the California ranch house into a vertical form that resembled the vernacular farm building. The tradition had playful, woodsy, and informal characteristics.  It was environmentally attentive, though more abstract. It was cubistic and featured dramatic natural light. A repository of plans from the tradition are housed at the Environmental Design Archives at the University of California, Berkeley.

See also
 First Bay Tradition
 Second Bay Tradition

References

Bay Tradition, Third
.
Bay Tradition, Third
Bay Tradition, Third